Estadio Cacique Diriangén is a multi-purpose stadium in Diriamba, Nicaragua.

It is currently used mostly for football matches and is the home stadium to Diriangén FC.  The stadium holds 7,500 people.

In April 2012, it was announced the stadium was to be renovated.

References

Football venues in Nicaragua
Multi-purpose stadiums in Nicaragua
Carazo Department